The 1989 NBA draft took place on June 27, 1989, in New York City. Despite eight of the top ten picks being considered busts, including the first two picks Pervis Ellison and Danny Ferry, the draft produced many talented players such as Shawn Kemp, Glen Rice, Sean Elliott, Nick Anderson, Dana Barros, Tim Hardaway, Vlade Divac, Clifford Robinson, B. J. Armstrong and Mookie Blaylock.

The draft was reduced from three rounds in the previous year to the two-round format that is still in use to the present day. As a result, NBA drafts from this season until 1995 produced the lowest number of total draft picks selected at 54 overall selections.

This was the first draft for the Minnesota Timberwolves and Orlando Magic, prior to their inaugural season. This was also the first draft televised prime time on U.S. national television.

Draft selections

Notable undrafted players
These players were not selected in the 1989 draft but played at least one game in the NBA.

Early entrants

College underclassmen
The following college basketball players successfully applied for early draft entrance.

  Nick Anderson – G, Illinois (junior)
  Rudy Bourgarel – C, Marist (junior)
  Martin Den Hengst – C, Sheridan (freshman)
  Jay Edwards – G, Indiana (sophomore)
  Benny Green – G, Tennessee–Chattanooga (junior)
  Shawn Kemp – F, Trinity Valley CC (freshman)
  Toney Mack – G, Georgia (junior)
  J. R. Reid – F, North Carolina (junior)
  Maurice Selvin – G, Puget Sound (sophomore)
  Alex Soyebo – C, Northland Pioneer (freshman)
  Johnny Steptoe – F, Southern (sophomore)
  Richard Whitmore – G, Brown (junior)

International players
The following international players successfully applied for early draft entrance.

  Vlade Divac – C, Partizan (Yugoslavia)

Notes

See also
 List of first overall NBA draft picks

References

External links
 1989 NBA Draft

Draft
National Basketball Association draft
NBA draft
NBA draft
1980s in Manhattan
Basketball in New York City
Sporting events in New York City
Sports in Manhattan
Madison Square Garden